Livio Armando Prieto (born 31 July 1981 in Córdoba) is an Argentine footballer.

Football career
In his early career, Prieto played for Club Atlético Bella Vista, Club Social, Deportivo y Cultural Español, Club Atlético Independiente, Club Atlético Nueva Chicago and Club Atlético Belgrano, with a small Greece stint in between (with AEK Athens FC).

In 2005–06, he moved abroad again, joining Clube Atlético Mineiro in Brazil, with subsequent spells at Club Sportif Sfaxien and C.D. Santa Clara. Prieto had agreed to terms to play for the Newcastle United Jets FC in the 2007–08 season of the Australian A-League, but apparently reneged on his contract after having been signed as a direct replacement for Nick Carle who left the club at the end of the previous campaign.

After leaving, he signed with Ecuador's Club Sport Emelec, moving shortly after to Portuguese top division side F.C. Paços de Ferreira. During one sole season, he appeared in two matches out of 30 (a total of 43 minutes).

On 18 December 2009, Prieto was hired by Duque de Caxias Futebol Clube in Brazil. After appearing rarely during his only season with the club, spent in Série B, he returned to his country and joined lowly Sportivo Italiano.

References

External links
 Livio Prieto – Argentine league statistics at Fútbol XXI  
 Livio Prieto at BDFA.com.ar 
 
 

1981 births
Living people
Footballers from Córdoba, Argentina
Argentine footballers
Association football midfielders
Argentine Primera División players
Deportivo Español footballers
Club Atlético Independiente footballers
Nueva Chicago footballers
Club Atlético Belgrano footballers
AEK Athens F.C. players
Clube Atlético Mineiro players
CS Sfaxien players
Duque de Caxias Futebol Clube players
Primeira Liga players
C.D. Santa Clara players
F.C. Paços de Ferreira players
C.S. Emelec footballers
Argentine expatriate footballers
Expatriate footballers in Greece
Expatriate footballers in Brazil
Expatriate footballers in Tunisia
Expatriate footballers in Portugal
Expatriate soccer players in Australia
Expatriate footballers in Ecuador
Argentine expatriate sportspeople in Portugal
Argentine expatriate sportspeople in Brazil
Argentine expatriate sportspeople in Australia
Argentine expatriate sportspeople in Tunisia
Argentine expatriate sportspeople in Greece